Here is a complete list of songs by the Korean boy group 2PM.

#

A

B

C

D

E

F

G

H

I

K

L

M

N

O

P

R

S

T

U

W

Y

 
2PM